Radiarctia screabile is a moth in the  family Erebidae. It was described by Wallengren in 1875. It is found in Angola, the Democratic Republic of Congo, Kenya, Malawi, South Africa, Sudan, Tanzania, Zambia and Zimbabwe.

Subspecies
Radiarctia screabile screabile
Radiarctia screabile nyangana Haynes, 2011 (Zimbabwe)

References

Natural History Museum Lepidoptera generic names catalog

Moths described in 1875
Spilosomina